The Love Market is a 1930 German silent film directed by Heinz Paul and starring Jean Murat, Erna Morena, and Renée Héribel.

The film's sets were designed by the art director Gustav A. Knauer and Willy Schiller.

Cast

References

Bibliography

External links

1930 films
Films of the Weimar Republic
German silent feature films
Films directed by Heinz Paul
German black-and-white films
1930s German films